Seth Davis is an American sportswriter and broadcaster. He is a host on Campus Insiders, an in-studio analyst for CBS' men's college basketball coverage, and an analyst for the NBA Draft on NBA TV. He currently writes for The Athletic and is a former writer for Sports Illustrated magazine.

Biography
Davis attended Duke University, graduating in 1992 with a degree in political science. He was host of a sports-related cable television show on Cable 13, and was also a sports columnist for the university's daily campus newspaper, The Chronicle.

Davis began writing at Sports Illustrated in July 1995. During his tenure at SI, he became a staff writer and authored the "Inside College Basketball" column during the college basketball season. It was announced on May 11, 2017, that he had been laid off from Sports Illustrated. Before joining Sports Illustrated, Davis spent several years at the New Haven Register, where he wrote about various sports, including the NFL, NBA, college basketball and local high school sports.

Davis appeared in an episode of the HBO show "Real Sex"  in 1996.

In 2003, his book Equinunk, Tell Your Story: My Return to Summer Camp about his experiences as a camp counselor, was published. His second book, When March Went Mad, was published in 2009.

He was also a reporter on The NFL Today.

In 2013, Davis joined Campus Insiders, campusinsiders.com, as an on-air host for their all-digital network. The Seth Davis Show launched on August 26, 2013.

In May 2017 he was fired by Sports Illustrated as a cost-cutting measure. He subsequently started work for The Athletic.

Personal
Davis was born in Connecticut and raised in Potomac, Maryland, and graduated from the Bullis School in 1988. Davis is married and has three children.

Davis is the son of Elaine Charney and Lanny Davis, who was the special counsel for former President Bill Clinton from 1996 to 1998.

Books
Equinunk, Tell Your Story: My Return to Summer Camp (2002)
When March Went Mad: The Game That Transformed Basketball (2009)
Wooden: A Coach's Life (2014)
Getting to Us: How Great Coaches Make Great Teams (2018)

References

External links

Seth Davis at SI.com

Duke University Trinity College of Arts and Sciences alumni
Living people
Sportspeople from Connecticut
People from Potomac, Maryland
College basketball announcers in the United States
National Football League announcers
1970 births
Sportswriters from Maryland
American people of Jewish descent